
Year 262 (CCLXII) was a common year starting on Wednesday (link will display the full calendar) of the Julian calendar. At the time, it was known as the Year of the Consulship of Gallienus and Faustianus (or, less frequently, year 1015 Ab urbe condita). The denomination 262 for this year has been used since the early medieval period, when the Anno Domini calendar era became the prevalent method in Europe for naming years.

Events 
 By place 

 Roman Empire 
 The Goths invade Asia Minor and destroy the Temple of Artemis in Ephesus.
 An earthquake strikes Ephesus and Pergamon and another strikes Cyrene.
 The Heruls accompany the Goths, ravaging the coasts of the Black Sea and the Aegean.

Births

Deaths 
 Ji Kang (or Shuye), Chinese Daoist philosopher and poet (b. 223)
 Marinus of Caesarea, Roman soldier and Christian martyr
 Valerian, Roman consul and emperor (approximate date)

References